Wendy Frew (née Telfer; born 15 October 1984 in Invercargill, New Zealand) is a New Zealand netball player. Frew was a previous member of the champion Southern Sting in the National Bank Cup from 2002 until 2007. With the start of the ANZ Championship in 2008, she remained in Southland playing for the new Southern Steel franchise. 2018 will be Frew's fifth season as captain and her 16th representing the southern franchise, including its predecessor the Sting.

Frew also made her debut for the Silver Ferns in 2008, against Australia. She also married on New Year's Eve 2009 and changed to her married name.

Frew is also a past member of the New Zealand White Sox softball squad.

Frew was named vice-captain of the Southern Steel for the 2009 ANZ Championship season, under Adine Wilson.

She remained vice-captain in 2010 and was named with Liana Leota co-captain for the 2011 season.

Frew has withdrawn from the Southern Steel squad for the 2012 ANZ Championship season as she is expecting her first child in August.

She returned to the Southern Steel in 2014 and played her 100th ANZ Championship for the side against Adelaide Thunderbirds.

In 2018 she announced her final retirement after her team won 54–53 against the Central Pulse at the ANZ Premiership.  Also this year the ILT Stadium Southland was temporary re-named the Wendy Frew Stadium in mark of her service to netball and retirement.

References

External links
2010 ANZ Championship profile

People educated at Verdon College
New Zealand netball players
Southern Steel players
ANZ Championship players
New Zealand international netball players
Sportspeople from Invercargill
Living people
1984 births
ANZ Premiership players
Southern Sting players